San Martín de la Virgen de Moncayo is a municipality located in the province of Zaragoza, Aragon, Spain. According to the 2004 census (INE), the municipality has a population of 291 inhabitants.

See also
Moncayo Massif

References

Municipalities in the Province of Zaragoza